Chelsea Hobbs (born February 18, 1985) is a Canadian actress. She is known for roles such as Gerda in the 2002 television film Snow Queen and Emily Kmetko in the ABC Family teen drama Make It or Break It.

Early life
Hobbs attended an advanced secondary school arts curriculum school, being enrolled in an intensive acting program. Starting at age 3, Hobbs began dancing.

Career
During her youth, Hobbs has appeared in over 40 commercials, and has appeared in the kids' improvisational TV series, No Adults Aloud. Her lead role as "Gerda" in Hallmark's Snow Queen and subsequent Leo Award nomination led to a TV pilot, Save the Last Dance. Hobbs had a recurring role on The L Word and played a part in Lords of Dogtown and Beach Girls. She has also appeared in Lifetime films such as The Party Never Stops: Diary of a Binge Drinker alongside Sara Paxton.

In 2008, Hobbs landed the leading role in the movie Confessions of a Go-Go Girl as Jane McCoy, a recent college graduate, who decides to scrap her plans for law school to pursue an acting career full-time, against her parents' wishes. In 2009, Hobbs was cast in the role of Emily Kmetko, an aspiring Olympic gymnast from the wrong side of the tracks, in ABC Family's Make It or Break It.  Hobbs was absent from the final 3 episodes of season 2 of Make It or Break, as she and her husband were expecting their second child.  In October 2011 she announced that she would not be returning for season 3.
 
In April 2010, Hobbs (playing Courtney Haywood) and her Make It or Break It co-star Cassie Scerbo (as Hillary Swanson) guest starred on the CSI: Miami episode "Spring Breakdown". In 2013, she starred in the Lifetime TV thriller The Trainer as well as HBO series The Transporter. Her 2014 credits include Hallmark's June in January and The Nine Lives of Christmas and a guest star on the television series Motive.

Personal life
Hobbs married photographer Teren Oddo in 2007 but they have since divorced. The couple have two children, a daughter (born in 2006) and a son (born in 2011).

Hobbs married James Neate in 2020. The couple have two children, a son (born in May 2020) and a daughter (born in January 2022).

Filmography

References

External links
 
 

1984 births
Living people
20th-century Canadian actresses
21st-century Canadian actresses
Actresses from Vancouver
Canadian child actresses
Canadian expatriate actresses in the United States
Canadian female dancers
Canadian film actresses
Canadian people of Irish descent
Canadian people of Scottish descent
Canadian people of Swedish descent
Canadian television actresses